Sigurd Dæhli (born 6 May 1953) is a Norwegian orienteering competitor. He became Relay World Champion in 1981, by participating on the Norwegian winning team in Thun, Switzerland. He obtained bronze in the 1983 Individual World Orienteering Championships in Zalaegerszeg, Hungary.

Orienteering career
Dæhli made his debut in senior Norwegian Championships in 1973, and since then had more than 100 starts in the national championships. He was winner of the first official Norwegian Night Orienteering Championship in 1979, and has participated on the winning relay team seven times in the national championships. He won gold medal in the Nordic Championships in Finland in 1977, and has two relay gold medals in the Nordic Championships (from 1980 and 1982).

At the 1981 World Orienteering Championships in Thun, Switzerland, he won a gold medal in the relay, along with Øyvin Thon, Harald Thon and Tore Sagvolden. He won an individual bronze medal at the 1983 World Orienteering Championships in Zalaegerszeg, behind Morten Berglia and Øyvin Thon.

He has won WMOC (World Master Orienteering Championships) several times.

Ski orienteering
Dæhli also competed in ski orienteering, obtaining an individual bronze medal in the 1982 World Championships in Austria, a silver medal in the relay in 1982 (together with Finn Kinneberg, Tore Sagvolden and Morten Berglia), and a relay gold medal in the 1986 World Championships in Bulgaria.

Family
Sigurd Dæhli is the father of international orienteer Magne Dæhli.

References

1953 births
Living people
People from Løten
Norwegian orienteers
Male orienteers
Foot orienteers
Ski-orienteers
World Orienteering Championships medalists
Sportspeople from Innlandet
20th-century Norwegian people